The Roman Catholic Church in Burundi is composed of 2 ecclesiastical provinces and 5 suffragan dioceses.

List of dioceses

Conference of Catholic Bishops of Burundi

Ecclesiastical Province of Bujumbura
Archdiocese of Bujumbura
Diocese of Bubanza
Diocese of Bururi

Ecclesiastical Province of Gitega
Archdiocese of Gitega
Diocese of Muyinga
Diocese of Ngozi
Diocese of Rutana
Diocese of Ruyigi

External links 
Catholic-Hierarchy entry.
GCatholic.org.

Burundi
Catholic dioceses